John Smith (born 23 July 1970) is an English footballer, who played as a full back in the Football League for Tranmere Rovers.

References

Tranmere Rovers F.C. players
1970 births
Association football fullbacks
English Football League players
Northwich Victoria F.C. players
Living people
Footballers from Liverpool
English footballers